= Yegorkino =

Yegorkino may refer to:

- Yegorkino, Chuvash Republic, a village in the Chuvash Republic, Russia
- Yegorkino, Republic of Tatarstan, a village (selo) in the Republic of Tatarstan, Russia
